Plumb is an unincorporated community in Thurston County, in the U.S. state of Washington. The community is located to the west of nearby Offutt Lake and lies in and around the Rocky Prairie Natural Area Preserve.

History
A post office called "Plum Station" was in operation from 1879 until 1885. The community was named after Elihu B. Plumb, who was credited with securing the town a post office.

References

Unincorporated communities in Thurston County, Washington